Below are the squads for the women's football tournament at the 1998 Asian Games, played in Bangkok, Thailand.

Group A

Japan
Coach: Satoshi Miyauchi

North Korea

Thailand

Vietnam

Group B

China
Coach: Ma Yuanan

Chinese Taipei
Coach: Kao Yong

India
Coach: S. Arumainayagam

South Korea
Coach: Lee Yi-woo

References

External links
RSSSF Link 1
RSSSF Link 2
RSSSF Link 3

1998
Squads